Great Synagogue of Tallinn was a synagogue in Maakri Street, Tallinn, Estonia. Nowadays, the Jews are using Tallinn Synagogue.

The synagogue was built in 1884, and it was designed by  senior.

After the March bombing in 1944, the synagogue was in fire. In 1947, the synagogue was demolished.

References

Religious buildings and structures in Tallinn
Synagogues in Estonia
Synagogues completed in 1884
Orthodox synagogues